The 1996 European Karate Championships, the 31st edition, was held  in Paris, France from May 21 to 23, 1996.

Competition

Team

Women's competition

Individual

Team

Medal table

References

External links
 Karate Records - European Championship 1996

1996
International sports competitions hosted by France
European Karate Championships
European championships in 1996
International sports competitions hosted by Paris
1996 in Paris
Karate competitions in France
May 1996 sports events in Europe